Yelgun is a small valley in Byron Shire, Northern New South Wales, Australia.

Farmers grow bananas, mangoes, passionfruit and papaya.  Although in the past there were several dairy farms and the farming of beans, zucchinis.  The valley is dominated by a prominent hill referred to as Chinamans Hill after a Chinese man who lived there until his death around the 1950s.

North Byron Parklands, a cultural, arts and music events venue, is located in Yelgun. The Falls Festival and Splendour in the Grass music festivals are held in the parklands.

References

Towns in New South Wales
Northern Rivers
Byron Shire